CBMT-DT (channel 6) is a television station in Montreal, Quebec, Canada, broadcasting the English-language service of CBC Television. It is owned and operated by the Canadian Broadcasting Corporation alongside Ici Radio-Canada Télé flagship CBFT-DT (channel 2). Both stations share studios at Maison Radio-Canada on René Lévesque Boulevard East in Downtown Montreal, while CBMT-DT's transmitter is located atop Mount Royal.

History
CBMT first signed on the air on January 10, 1954, as Montreal's second television station; previously, English and French-language programs had shared time on CBFT, Canada's first television station. By the end of 1953, Canada had about a dozen television stations either licensed or under construction, and American competition was about to arrive in Montreal with the construction of WCAX-TV in Burlington, Vermont and WIRI-TV in Plattsburgh, New York (now known as WPTZ). The CBC decided that it was imperative to stop time-sharing in English and in French, so CBMT was included in the network's expansion plans for television; upon its sign-on, CBMT became the exclusive English-language CBC station for Montreal; CBFT, simultaneous to this, became an exclusive French-language station.

The station was branded in the late 1970s and early 1980s as "Montreal 6", becoming "CBC Television Montreal 6" by the mid-1980s, and "CBC Television Montreal" during the 1990s. Since 1997, CBMT has been the only full-fledged CBC station in the province of Quebec. Previously, the only other CBC station in the province had been Quebec City's CKMI-TV. However, in 1997, CKMI switched its affiliation to the Global Television Network. CBMT set up a full-power rebroadcaster, CBVE, on CKMI's old channel 5, while CKMI moved to channel 20.

CBMT transmits from the Mount Royal candelabra tower, in Mount Royal Park, overlooking the city of Montreal. As a result, channel 6 experiences severe multipath interference in parts of the city and South Shore.

It was also previously seen unscrambled on C-band satellite until the early-2000s, when it switched to a proprietary digital satellite signal. When the signal was sent unscrambled on the C-band, many American satellite viewers tuned into CBMT for a variety of news, entertainment, and sports – particularly CBC's Hockey Night in Canada and Olympic Games television broadcasts, which gave a different perspective than the American broadcasts. That Canadian signal is still available, but it requires the purchase of a dedicated and expensive receiver, or a grey market subscription to a Canadian satellite service.

Due to several cutbacks over the years, master control for the station is now based at the Canadian Broadcasting Centre in Toronto.

News operation
CBMT-DT presently broadcasts 10 hours, 40 minutes of locally produced newscasts each week (with two hours each weekday, a half-hour on Saturdays and ten minutes on Sundays); in regards to the number of hours devoted to news programming, it is the lowest local newscast output out of any English-language television station in the Montreal market. CBMT airs local news programming for Montreal seven days a week. On weekdays, the station airs a 30-minute newscast at 6:00 pm to 6:30 p.m. and a half-hour newscast at 11 p.m. On weekends, Montreal at 6 airs on Saturdays for 30 minutes and a ten-minute summary airs on Sundays at 11 p.m.

Technical information

Analogue-to-digital conversion
CBMT began broadcasting its digital signal over-the-air on February 21, 2005. On August 31, 2011, when Canadian television stations in CRTC-designated mandatory markets transitioned from analogue to digital broadcasts, the station's digital signal remained on UHF channel 21. Through the use of PSIP, digital television receivers display CBMT-DT's virtual channel as 6.1.

Former transmitters
CBMT once operated over 50 analogue rebroadcasters throughout the province of Quebec and in three communities in northern Manitoba: Brochet, Poplar River, and Shamattawa.

Due to federal funding reductions to the CBC, in April 2012, the CBC responded with substantial budget cuts, which included shutting down CBC's and Radio-Canada's remaining analogue transmitters on July 31, 2012. None of CBC or Radio-Canada's rebroadcasters were converted to digital.

Transmitters in mandatory markets were required to go digital or be taken off the air by the transition deadline of August 31, 2011. The CBC had originally decided that none of its rebroadcasters will transition to digital and instead will remain in analogue. The CBC had rebroadcasters of CBMT in the following mandatory markets:
 CBVE-TV Quebec City
 CBJET Saguenay
 CBMT-3 Sherbrooke
 CBMT-1 Trois-Rivières

On August 16, 2011, the Canadian Radio-television and Telecommunications Commission (CRTC) granted the CBC permission to continue operating 22 repeaters in mandatory markets, including the above, in analogue until August 31, 2012, by which time the transmitters had to be converted to digital or shut down.

Quebec

Northeast Ontario

Northern Manitoba

Audience outside Canada
CBMT also has substantial viewership in the United States, mostly from Maine to northeastern New York. It is also seen via cable television in Michigan, northern Wisconsin, and northern Minnesota; CBMT is the main CBC station for Charter Spectrum systems in Bay City, Midland, Mount Pleasant, Alpena and Marquette, Michigan.

CBMT is also broadcast in Jamaica and Trinidad and Tobago on Flow Cable and in the Bahamas on Cable Bahamas.

See also 
 List of Quebec media

References

External links 
CBC Montreal
 
CBMT at TV Hat

BMT-DT
BMT-DT
Television channels and stations established in 1954
English-language mass media in Quebec
1954 establishments in Quebec